

The Resort 

Alpine skiing began on the site in 1944. Actor Robert Redford acquired the area in 1968, and established a year-round resort that would later spawn the independent Sundance Film Festival and the non-profit Sundance Institute. The resort was first listed as a census-designated place (CDP) before the 2020 census.

History
The area known today as the Sundance Resort in the North Fork canyon was surveyed in the mid-1800s by Andrew Jackson Stewart Jr. and his sons, Andrew, Scott, and John Stewart. While working for the U.S. government, they discovered the view of Mt. Timpanogos. They each received 160 acres of land under the Homestead Act, and nearby lots were given to family members. Soon, members of the Stewart family erected log cabins. By 1911, they owned 2,200 acres and were raising sheep and cattle. They formed a company, North Folk Investment Co., to share income and protect the land. The area was known as "Stewart Flats" after the large number of Stewart family members living in the area.

Until 1920, "Stewart Flats" was connected to the wider world by a single unpaved road with a grade of 18 to 20 degrees on the last half mile. It was referred to as the "big dugway" due to the trench formed from dragging large trees down the road. In the early 1920s, the Utah County Commission built an automobile road that passed through "Stewart Falls" as it connected the towns of Aspen Grove and Wildwood.

Hiking trails
Mount Timpanogos became a popular mountain to hike after 1912, when Eugene L. Roberts, a professor at Brigham Young University opened a hiking trail and began taking students. The Timpanogos Hike began after mid-July when there was a full moon. The night before the hike, participants would gather for a celebration that usually had a bonfire. A favorite part of the celebration was the enactment of the "Legend of Timpanogos" that tells the story of an Indian princess who falls in love with a soldier who goes off to war; the soldier did not return, but she watched and waited for him atop Mount Timpanogos until she died. Roberts' event spawned an annual Timpanogos Hike.

In 1922, the Forest Service over the Wasatch National Forest, part of the United States Department of Agriculture, requested to put in a trail that crossed part of the property owned by the North Folk Investment Co, The Stewart family appreciated the hikes since they brought more popularity to the area. Today, the trails around the Sundance Mountain Resort offer views of North Fork, Utah and of Stewart Falls. Many trails also feature plaques to mark flora and fauna in the area and are lined with benches. There are also three major biking trails at Sundance that even have ski-lift service after Memorial Day weekend.

Timp Haven
Ski races began on the Mount Timpanogos Glacier during the annual Timp hike in July 1941. The race was a slalom race. This race would be held three more times in 1947, 1948, and 1949. A ski area later opened as Timp Haven in 1944. The name was chosen by a contest in which anyone could submit their suggestion. Ruth Biddulph submitted the winning name of Timp Haven and was given a season pass. Timp Haven was owned by S. Paul Stewart and run with the help of his brother Ray Stewart for over twenty years. Paul managed the slopes, built the ski lodge, and installed the water system. Ray Stewart was responsible for clearing and developing the Timp Haven Ski Resort and contributed to the original rope tow used. Hilda Stewart, Paul's wife, had a cafe on the resort property and served hamburgers and other meals to ski guests. Paul later purchased the interests of other members of the Stewart family, which altogether owned between 3,000 and 4,000 acres of the property. The investment in the land in North Fork never paid dividends for the North Fork Investment Company owners.

The resort had a rope tow that was built by J.W. Daniel, who had tried to make a tow in Hobble Creek Canyon near Springville, Utah. The tow was powered by a Chevrolet truck, but was unsuccessful in that area. The Timpanogos Mountain Club persuaded Daniel to bring the tow to North Fork Canton. The tow was not ready for winter of 1944, and so it was abandoned by the club. Ray Stewart  bought the truck and equipment and overhauled it to create a working tow to run on Saturdays and Sundays. The tow was difficult to use, however, because some of the roads leading to the resort were not plowed regularly making it difficult to drive the truck, and cold mornings caused the vehicle to freeze over. The tow pulled skiers 500 feet up the mountain. In addition, When Timp Haven opened, the creek was closer to the hill than it is today, so skiers had to make a quick turn at the bottom to avoid falling into the water. Ski season at Timp Haven started around Christmas and lasted until early March. A day pass to ski was only $1, and due to lighting installed by Provo City, Timp Haven allowed night skiing on Mondays, Wednesdays, and Fridays. While owned by the Stewart family, the ski area was closed on Sundays. 
Timp Haven also held ski races that were sponsored by various local organizations like the Timpanogos Ski Club or the Hoover Cup. The Timponogos Mountain Club cleared an area on the east hill and built a 45-foot ski jump.

Ski classes at the resort were started by Jessie Scofield, the supervisor of Provo City Recreation, in the winter of 1946. Professors at Brigham Young University also started ski classes, bringing buses of students in the afternoons. By that time, Timp Haven also had a tubing and toboggan hill. A 1938 Ford truck provided the power for the lift. This lift ran until 1953 when a single chairlift was added in the fall. The first double chairlift was installed in the fall of 1965 and replaced the lower single chair and an upper T-bar, vertically climbing . It had an accident the following July which resulted in two fatalities. The resort continued expanding, however, and a lodge was built in 1957 (whose foundation is under the General Store and Grill Room today). A poma lift was added in 1958. A modern ski lift, the Mandan, was installed in 1964 and the two T-bar lifts were removed. The Navajo lift was installed in 1969, and the Arrowhead lift in 1985.

Ownership under Robert Redford
The Stewart family built a subdivision on "Stewart Flats" in the 1960s called Timp Haven Homes. Robert Redford purchased a 2-acre lot. Later, in August 1968, Redford purchased the entirety of Timp Haven, the land that is now known as Sundance, The resort was renamed from Timp Haven to Sundance, after the role Redford played in the 1969 film Butch Cassidy and the Sundance Kid. The resort of Sundance is not to be confused with the town of Sundance, Wyoming, the location from which the Sundance Kid received his name.  Redford's 1972 film Jeremiah Johnson was filmed near the resort.

Because of its lower elevation, the resort had a shorter ski season than its competitors. In order to increase revenue, Redford wanted to create an Aspen-like atmosphere and use the resort to promote the arts and draw in Hollywood stars. The Sundance Film Festival was held at the resort to help it achieve this purpose.

Sundance Institute and Film Festival
In November 1979, Redford held a 3-day conference for filmmakers and professional artists at the Sundance Mountain Resort. The goal of the event was to promote indie filmmakers. These efforts laid the foundation for what would become the Sundance Institute. In 1981, the Sundance Institute was founded to foster and celebrate the diversity of American filmmaking.

In 1985, the Sundance Institute took over operations of the United States Film Festival. The organization had been founded in 1978, however, it became a part of Sundance, and in 1989 the name was officially changed to the Sundance Film Festival. In 1985 Redford hosted the first film festival at Sundance to promote independent films. Redford initially objected to taking over the film festival, and in its early years it was "regarded by many [film] distributors as toxic". In 1989, however, the film festival gained recognition after its showing of Sex, Lies, and Videotape by Steven Soderbergh. That was the year the festival began to achieve its goal of shaping independent film making. Although it has increased in popularity, the film festival has maintained its support of the making and distribution of indie films.

It is the largest independent film festival in the United States, and also one of the largest in the world. It features documentaries, large films and small films. The festival receives over 9,000 submissions, and around 200 are featured. More than 50,000 people attend the festival each year.

The small town that surrounds the resort is home to 28 full-time residents, with many residents living in the area more than 50 years. Several notable people have owned residencies in the Sundance Resort properties, including Sidney Pollock, William Devane, and Daniel Melnick.

New ownership

Robert Redford reached an agreement to sell the 2,600-acre resort to Broadreach Capital Partners and Cedar Capital Partners. He announced the sale to employees on December 11, 2020.

Though the resort has been Redford's Utah home for more than a half-century, it also "created a lot of weight for me to be carrying around", Redford told the Salt Lake Tribune in December 2020, ahead of the announcement of the sale. "I had been searching for years for the right people to take it to the next level, so that I could take that weight off my shoulders and enjoy my life".

As part of the sale, Broadreach and Cedar have committed to continue Redford's policies of responsible development and land preservation. The resort's 2,600 acres include 1,845 acres that are preserved through a conservation easement and protective covenants.

There has been speculation among locals that the purchase was in fact a lease amendment, transfer, or option on the original 100-year lease agreement entered into between Redford and the Stewart family back in 1968 when Redford acquired the Timp Haven Resort from them. The terms of Redford's purchase have not been confirmed since the details of the sale remain private. The reasons for the speculation are also unknown.

Recent developments

Skiing trails

Today, Sundance Mountain Resort has skiing for every ability, with 20% beginner trails, 40% intermediate trails and 40% advanced trails. The resort terrain climbs 2,150 vertical feet up the northeast slope of Mount Timpanogos, reaching the crest of the ridge at Bearclaw Cabin.

Chairlifts
In 1994, CTEC constructed a fixed-grip quad named Ray's, to honor Ray Stewart and his work in developing Timp Haven. The lift offered direct access to the back of the mountain and covered over 5,400 feet with a vertical rise of 1,400 feet, with an uphill capacity of 1,800 people per hour.

The mountain is serviced by four chairlifts and a handle tow for beginners at the mountain's base. Sundance now offers the 6th longest zip line in the United States, which features the most vertical drop of any zip line on the North American Continent.

In 2016, the Arrowhead triple was retired and replaced with a fixed-grip quad, constructed by Doppelmayr USA. The new lift was named Red's, after Redford and his family, and carried 500 more people uphill per hour over its predecessor.

For the 2021-2022 season, Doppelmayr USA constructed two chairlifts to replace the aging Ray's lift. The front side portion was replaced by a high speed quad, known as the Outlaw Express, running on an alignment previously used by the Mandan double chairlift that Ray's replaced, with a mid-unload station below Marmot Gulch to service beginner terrain that had been accessible from the winter mid-station on Ray's. The backside portion was replaced with a new fixed grip quad called Stairway, running from the bottom of Red's to the Mandan summit.

References

"Major Improvement Announced at Sundance Mountain Resort.". SKIUTAH. Retrieved 8 December 2016.

External links

 
 Sundance Film Festival
 The Sundance Institute
 Barbara Stewart Anderson collection on Raymond R. and Ava Beckstrand Stewart, MSS 8176, at L. Tom Perry Special Collections, Brigham Young University. Includes information on the development of the Timp Haven lodge. 
 Raymond Stewart Collection – University of Utah
 Ski resort of the week, Deseret Morning News, March 24, 2005
 1993 Ski Archives Historical Achievement Award
 Heraldextra.com

Ski areas and resorts in Utah
Utah culture
Buildings and structures in Utah County, Utah
Wasatch Range
1944 establishments in Utah
Census-designated places in Utah
Census-designated places in Utah County, Utah